Henri Greffulhe (29 July 1815 – 8 April 1879) was a French politician. He was made a Senator for life.

References

1815 births
1879 deaths
French life senators